Farrangalway railway station was on the Cork and Kinsale Junction Railway in County Cork, Ireland.

History

The station opened on 27 June 1863.

Regular passenger services were withdrawn on 31 August 1931.

Routes

Further reading

References

Disused railway stations in County Cork
Railway stations opened in 1863
Railway stations closed in 1931